Brandon Lundy (born 5 July 1996) is an Australian footballer who plays as a full back for Avondale FC in the National Premier Leagues Victoria.

Club career
He made his senior professional debut for Newcastle Jets in the 2014 FFA Cup in a match against Perth Glory at the Wanderers Oval on 5 August 2014. Perth won the match 0–2 in regulation time.

References

Living people
Association football forwards
Australian soccer players
Newcastle Jets FC players
National Premier Leagues players
1996 births